The River Line was the last Atlanta streetcar line and ran from 1892 to 1949.

The line ran from Downtown Atlanta via Marietta Street, over the Jones Avenue bridge to the English Avenue neighborhood, through which they proceeded on two routes:
 one via Simpson (now Joseph E. Boone) and Ashby (now Joseph E. Lowry) to Bellwood Ave. (later Bankhead Highway, now Donald Lee Hollowell Pkwy.)
 the other via Kennedy (now Cameron M. Alexander) and English Avenue to Bellwood Ave.
Then the line ran out Bellwood Ave. to Almond Park to the Riverside community at the Chattahoochee River northwest of the city. Originally, the western extension of Bellwood Avenue was known as the "M&T Ferry Road".

It ceased operation in 1949.

References

External links
 Trolley Lines Atlanta's Upper West Side
 Trolley Atlanta's Upper West Side

Transportation in Atlanta
Streetcars in Georgia (U.S. state)
Railway lines opened in 1892
Railway lines closed in 1949